Independent Baptist churches (some also called Independent Fundamental Baptist or IFB) are Christian congregations, generally holding to conservative (primarily fundamentalist) Baptist beliefs. Although some Independent Baptist churches refuse affiliation with Baptist denominations, various Independent Baptist Church denominations have been founded.

History

The modern Independent Baptist tradition began in the late 19th and early 20th centuries among local denominational Baptist congregations whose members were concerned about the advancement of modernism and liberalism into national Baptist denominations and conventions in the United States and the United Kingdom.

In response to the concerns, some local Baptist churches separated from their former denominations and conventions and reestablished the congregations as Independent Baptist churches.  In other cases, the more conservative members of existing churches withdrew from their local congregations and set about establishing new Independent Baptist churches.

Although some Independent Baptist churches refuse affiliation with Baptist denominations, various Independent Baptist Church denominations have been founded. There is the World Baptist Fellowship founded in 1933 at Fort Worth, Texas by J. Frank Norris. Doctrinal differences in the latter led to the founding of the Baptist Bible Fellowship International in 1950 and the Independent Baptist Fellowship International in 1984. Various independent Baptist Bible colleges were also founded.

Beliefs 

The beliefs are mainly Baptist and fundamentalist. They refuse any form of ecclesial authority other than that of the local church. Great emphasis is placed on the literal interpretation of the Bible as the primary method of Bible study. Dispensationalism is common among Independent Baptists. They are opposed to social justice and any ecumenical movement with denominations that do not have the same beliefs.

Demographics
Members of Independent Baptist churches comprised 2.5% of the United States adult population, according to a 2014 survey by the Pew Research Center.

See also

 Association of Independent Methodists
 IFCA International
 New Independent Fundamentalist Baptist
 List of Independent Baptist higher education institutions
 Southwide Baptist Fellowship

References

Bibliography 
Timothy Gloege, Guaranteed Pure: The Moody Bible Institute, Business, and the Making of Modern Evangelicalism (2015).
Barry Hankins, God's Rascal: J. Frank Norris & the Beginnings of Southern Fundamentalism (1996).
Andrew Himes, The Sword of the Lord: The Roots of Fundamentalism in an American Family (2011).
George M. Marsden, Fundamentalism and American Culture: The Shaping of Twentieth Century Evangelicalism, 1870–1925 (1980).
Robert F. Martin, Hero of the Heartland: Billy Sunday and the Transformation of American Society, 1862–1935 (2002).
Daniel K. Williams, God's Own Party: The Making of the Christian Right (2010).

External links

Directory of independent Baptist churches in the United States and worldwide

Baptist movements
Fundamentalist denominations
Independent Baptist